Allen Benton Morse (January 7, 1837 – July 1, 1921) was an American diplomat, jurist and politician.

Born in Otisco, Ionia County, Michigan, Morse studied at the Michigan State Agricultural College for two years. He then served in the 21st Michigan Volunteer Infantry Regiment during the American Civil War and was badly wounded losing his left arm. He then studied and then practiced law in Ionia, Michigan. He served as county attorney of Ionia County in 1867. Morse also served on the Ionia City Council and as mayor of Ionia, Michigan in 1882. In 1875, Morse served in the Michigan State Senate and was a Democrat. Morse then served on the Michigan Supreme Court from 1885 to 1892 and was chief justice. In 1892, Morse sought the Democratic nomination for the Governor of Michigan and lost the race. Morse then served as United States consul, in Glasgow, Scotland from 1893 to 1897. Around this time, Morse switched to the Republican Party. Morse died suddenly at his home in Ionia, Michigan.

Notable Opinions 

 Sherwood v. Walker

Notes

1837 births
1921 deaths
People from Ionia County, Michigan
People of Michigan in the American Civil War
Michigan State University alumni
American consuls
American amputees
American politicians with disabilities
Michigan city council members
Mayors of places in Michigan
Democratic Party Michigan state senators
Chief Justices of the Michigan Supreme Court
People from Ionia, Michigan
19th-century American diplomats
19th-century American politicians
19th-century American judges
Justices of the Michigan Supreme Court